Pipeline Under the Ocean is the second studio album by the New Zealand rock band Pluto, released on 7 February 2005. A second version was released in late 2005 with the video clips for the songs "Radio Crimes", "Long White Cross" and "Dance Stamina".

Track listing
Radio Crimes
Long White Cross
Madeline
8 O'Clock
Dance Stamina
On Your Own
Baghdad Boy
Moja Rijeka
Baby Cruel
Rock n Roll
Perfectly Evil
Broken Hearted

Special edition bonus videos
Radio Crimes
Long White Cross
Dance Stamina

Pluto (New Zealand band) albums
2005 albums